The 1928 North Carolina gubernatorial election was held on November 6, 1928. Democratic nominee O. Max Gardner defeated Republican nominee Herbert F. Seawell, with just over 55% of the vote. This was, relatively, a close election for the time in North Carolina, with Gardner receiving the smallest percentage of the vote that any Democratic gubernatorial nominee won between 1900 and 1956. The result came against the backdrop of divisions in the state Democratic Party over the controversial nomination of Alfred E. Smith for president. Gardner supported Smith, who lost the state to Herbert Hoover.

Primary elections

Democratic primary
O. Max Gardner, the former Lieutenant Governor, was unopposed for the Democratic nomination.

General election

Candidates
O. Max Gardner, Democratic
Herbert F. Seawell, Republican, attorney and former United States Attorney for the Eastern District of North Carolina

Results

References

1928
North Carolina
Gubernatorial